Campus is a village in Round Grove and Broughton townships, Livingston County, Illinois. The population was 166 at the 2010 census.

History
The town was named "Campus" because the many trees made someone think of a college campus. 

Sheldon was a farmer and he owned the first business in town, Campus Brick & Tile Co. He later sold the company, which passed through several owners before closing in 1952. Over the years the tile company produced millions of feet of drain tile and was one of the principal industries in the town.

Thomas Feehery (1839-1926) built the first store and post office in Campus. The Chariton brothers built the second store in town. In 1896, the first hotel was built. Other businesses at that time included Ole Nelson and Thomas Connors' livery stable.

Campus had a water system by 1894. The town also had street lights, cement sidewalks, an electric light plant and tile drains, which were great improvements for such an isolated rural town in those early years.

The town had a disastrous fire in 1897 that destroyed three of the business houses. A brick building was built on the ruins.

Sacred Heart Catholic Church was the first brick structure in the village. The Catholic Church had its start in the area in the 1870s when a small church was built in Broughton Township a mile south of Campus. The building was later moved into town.

The present brick building on Elm Street was begun in June 1983 and completed a year later. A rectory was built next to the church. A convent school was built in 1898 on the other side of Elm Street. The school closed in 1930 and was vacant for several years. It later served as a vocation center and home for priests.

By the 1970s the former school building had become a rooming house and laundromat. The beautiful building later became vacant and in disrepair.

Joseph Zeller (1918-2018), Pennsylvania businessman and state legislator, was born in Campus.

Geography
Campus is located in northeastern Livingston County at  (41.023691, -88.306503). Most of the village is in Round Grove Township, but four blocks of the village are in Broughton Township to the south.

Demographics

As of the census of 2000, there were 145 people, 40 households, and 31 families residing in the village. The racial makeup of the village was 100.00% White. Hispanic or Latino of any race were 1.38% of the population.

There were 40 households, out of which 55.0% had children under the age of 18 living with them, 60.0% were married couples living together, 10.0% had a female householder with no husband present, and 22.5% were non-families. 15.0% of all households were made up of individuals, and 7.5% had someone living alone who was 65 years of age or older. The average household size was 3.63 and the average family size was 4.10.

In the village, the population was spread out, with 42.1% under the age of 18, 9.0% from 18 to 24, 32.4% from 25 to 44, 10.3% from 45 to 64, and 6.2% who were 65 years of age or older. The median age was 24 years. For every 100 females, there were 119.7 males. For every 100 females age 18 and over, there were 100.0 males.

The median income for a household in the village was $47,750, and the median income for a family was $49,250. Males had a median income of $36,250 versus $21,250 for females. The per capita income for the village was $19,005. There were 3.7% of families and 3.4% of the population living below the poverty line, including 7.5% of under eighteens and none of those over 64.

Notes

References
Cardiff: Ghost Town of the Prairie; With a History of Clarke City, Tracy, Torino, Campus and the Disaster at the Diamond and Cherry, by Jim Ridings. Published by Side Show Books, Herscher, Illinois, 2006.
Historical Encyclopedia of Illinois and History of Livingston County, ed. Bateman, Selby, Strawn, Johnson and Franzen. Chicago: Munsell Publishing Company, 1909

External links
Campus Il Attractions

Villages in Livingston County, Illinois
Villages in Illinois